The River Mountains are a mountain range in Clark County, Nevada that demarcate the Las Vegas Watershed from the Lake Mead Watershed.

References

External links

Mountain ranges of Nevada
Mountain ranges of Clark County, Nevada